Lee Sinnott (born 12 July 1965) is an English professional football manager and former player who was most recently manager of Gainsborough Trinity.

As a player, he was a defender for Walsall, Watford, Bradford City, Crystal Palace, Huddersfield Town, Oldham Athletic and Scarborough. His biggest impact was at Bradford City, where he stayed for five years over two spells, making over 200 appearances. He made 505 appearances in the English Football League, and 653 appearances in all competitions. He played in the 1984 FA Cup Final for Watford, taking home a runners-up medal.

As manager of Farsley Celtic between 2003 and 2007, he won promotion three times in four seasons to take the club from the Northern Premier League to the Conference. This was followed by a short spell at Port Vale in the 2007–08 season. He managed Bradford Park Avenue for ten months in 2009, before returning to the game with Altrincham in May 2011. He led Altrincham to promotion out of the Conference North via the play-offs in 2014, but was sacked in March 2016. He returned to management with Gainsborough Trinity in February 2018, lasting 12 months in the role.

Playing career
Born in Aldridge, Staffordshire, he began his career at Walsall as an apprentice, signing professional in 1982. He made 40 first-team appearances in his first season at Fellows Park before he was sold to First Division runners-up Watford for a £130,000 fee in September 1983. His final appearance for the "Saddlers" came in an 8–1 defeat at Bolton Wanderers. There he was coached by Steve Harrison, John Ward and Graham Taylor, whilst playing alongside veteran centre-back Steve Terry. He established himself in the first-team following Ian Bolton's departure and an injuries to Steve Sims and Paul Franklin. At the end of his first season, when still only 18 years old, he played in the 1984 FA Cup final against Everton at Wembley Stadium, collecting a runners-up medal. However he went on to lose his place to new signing John McClelland and had to fit into the team as a full-back and at left midfield during the 1984–85 season. He helped Watford reach the semifinals of the FA Cup in the 1986–87 campaign and played at left-back across from Chris Waddle in the defeat to Tottenham Hotspur.

In 1987, Sinnott moved down a division to Bradford City. In his first season, he helped the "Bantams" qualify for the Second Division playoffs, but their promotion bid failed and two years later they were relegated. Sinnott spent one season in the Third Division before moving to First Division side Crystal Palace for a £300,000 fee on 8 August 1991. He was unable to establish a regular place in the first team and after two years he returned to Bradford on 9 December 1993.

When Sinnott returned to Valley Parade, Bradford were still in the third tier of the English league. He played in most of their first-team games that season, but the "Bantams" missed out on the play-offs and manager Frank Stapleton was sacked. Sinnott followed his manager out of the exit door and signed for local rivals Huddersfield Town. He was made captain of Neil Warnock's team, and guided them to the Second Division play-off victory in his first season. He spent two more seasons in West Yorkshire before crossing the Pennines and signing for local rivals Oldham Athletic, who had just been relegated to the Second Division.

Sinnott played 31 games over two seasons at Boundary Park, but Oldham struggled in a division that they had been expected to win promotion from, and in Sinnott's second season they narrowly avoided relegation to the Third Division. A year earlier, he had been loaned back to Bradford, but the move was not made permanent.

The 1998–99 campaign proved to be Sinnott's final season as a Football League player. Upon its conclusion he moved to Scarborough, who had just been relegated to the Conference, and played 22 games in one season for a side who finished fourth in the country's highest non-league division. He then retired from playing after a career spanning almost 20 years.

Style of play
Sinnott was a quick, athletic and versatile defender who boasted excellent long-ball throwing ability.

Managerial career

Farsley Celtic
Sinnott was not out of football for long, and moved into management with non-league Farsley Celtic in June 2003. His first success with the club was a third-place finish in the Northern Premier League First Division in 2003–04, which earned the club promotion to the Northern Premier League.

Sinnott would have achieved another promotion in his second season at Throstle Nest as Farsley topped the Northern Premier League at the end of the season. However this was only on the FA's decision that Spennymoor United's records were expunged after they folded. The other clubs in the promotion mix appealed and the FA reversed their decision to expunge the results, leaving Farsley in third place and having to compete in the play-offs. Despite a 1–0 semi final win over Whitby Town, they lost in the final to Workington on penalties.

Another promotion was achieved in 2005–06, as Sinnott and Farsley bounced back from their play-off set-back. This time Farsley finished fourth in the regulation season before defeating Marine 1–0 and then North Ferriby United 2–1 in the final. Sinnott also added the West Riding County Cup to Farsley's trophy cabinet for the tenth time in the club's history, as they made it a double winning campaign in 2005–06.

The 2006–07 season saw Sinnott steer Farsley  to a third promotion in four seasons. Despite finishing fifth in the Conference North, Lee lead the club to victory in the playoffs ensuring Farsley Celtic's first ever appearance in the top flight of Non-League. In the play off campaign, Farsley beat favourites Kettering Town in the semifinal, before going on to beat Hinckley United in the final played at Burton Albion's Pirelli Stadium. In the final Farsley Celtic had been 3–2 down with just over ten minutes remaining before two late goals saw a remarkable comeback and a 4–3 victory.

Farsley's three promotions under Sinnott and the declines of Bradford City and their local rivals Leeds United meant that just one and two divisions separated Farsley from its neighbours, when seven years ago six divisions separated them.

Port Vale
In October 2007, Sinnott was linked with the vacant job at League One team Port Vale, and on 1 November 2007 Farsley Celtic's chairman Andrew Firbank told fans that Sinnott would soon be leaving the club. However, hours later, confusion arose when Sinnott denied resigning. Five days later he was named the new Port Vale manager, ending the speculation about his future. Prominent backroom staff member Dean Glover had hoped to gain the management spot himself, and so pondered resigning from the club, but eventually chose to remain as Sinnott's assistant. The only significant staff member Sinnott was allowed to bring in was scout Steve Joesbury. In his first league game in charge Vale lost to local rivals Crewe Alexandra. Sinnott achieved his first win in charge of the club at Morecambe in the FA Cup First Round, with Port Vale winning 2–0. However the Second Round held embarrassment for both Sinnott and the club, as Southern League side Chasetown (an eighth tier team 101 league places below the Vale) picked up a 1–1 draw at Vale Park, before making a giant-killing with a late goal on their home ground, after Luke Rodgers missed two penalties. Sinnott warned of big changes at the club. He signed Chasetown duo Chris Slater and Kyle Perry, and heavily exploited the loan market. He ultimately proved unable to save the club from relegation, and they were relegated on 12 April 2008. With only 38 points from 46 games, they finished ahead of bottom-placed Luton Town only thanks to a ten-point deduction inflicted upon Luton. In the summer ten players left or were offloaded by Sinnott, as he attempted to make room for new signings.

To make a success of the 2008–09 season, Sinnott brought in former Hereford United defender John McCombe, and former Middlesbrough midfielder Steve Thompson. Both players cited Sinnott as their reason for joining the club. He also added experienced defender Sam Stockley (Wycombe Wanderers); attacker Rob Taylor (Nuneaton Borough); midfielder Anthony Griffith (Doncaster Rovers); and attacking midfielder Louis Dodds (Leicester City) to the squad. Lee Collins also joined on an extended loan from Wolverhampton Wanderers, and would sign a permanent contract with the club in January. He appointed Stockley as his captain. The team continued to struggle, and on 18 September Sinnott admitted that "we are looking to improve, without a shadow of a doubt". However a 4–1 home defeat to Macclesfield Town two days later would prove to be Sinnott's last game in charge. He was sacked two days later, with the "Valiants" lying in 16th place. Three months on from his sacking, the club were yet to reach a compensation settlement with Sinnott, before an agreement was reached in February 2009. The club went on to finish the season in 18th place under Dean Glover. Despite the poor results Vale picked up during his reign, many of Sinnott's signings would become key players for the club over the next few seasons.

Bradford Park Avenue
Sinnott was linked with a vacant position at newly promoted Northern Premier League side Bradford Park Avenue at the end of 2008. The club were unwilling to pursue the interest because of Sinnott's unresolved contract with Port Vale, and instead appointed his former Farsley assistant and successor John Deacey. However, despite Sinnott still taking legal action against Port Vale, Park Avenue appointed Sinnott as their new manager just one month later; Avenue were 11th in the Northern Premier League Premier Division at the time of his appointment, with Deacey standing aside to become Sinnott's assistant once again. Sinnott's first game ended in a 2–0 defeat to Eastwood Town. By the end of the season Avenue were in seventh place, two points and two places outside the play-off zone. He admitted that "the quality of the UniBond Premier is higher than I remember it to be three or four years ago. You don't get any freebies, without a shadow of a doubt."

He left by mutual consent in October 2009, after a summer spending spree failed to produce results on the pitch for the 2009–10 season. Avenue recovered to finish the season in second place under Deacey, though lost to Boston United in the play-off final.

Altrincham
In May 2011, Sinnott was announced as the new manager of Altrincham, a club that had just been relegated from the Conference National into the Conference North. The club finished eighth in the Conference North in 2011–12, before securing a play-off position with a fourth-place finish in 2012–13. They were beaten 4–2 by Brackley Town in the play-off semi-finals. The "Robins" again qualified for the play-offs in the 2013–14 campaign, and went on to secure promotion with a 2–1 extra-time victory over Guiseley in the play-off final. Altrincham finished 17th in the 2014–15 season, comfortably away from the relegation zone. He left Altrincham on 9 March 2016, following a run of seven league games without a victory that left the club 21st in the table, one point adrift of safety. His assistant, Neil Tolson, was appointed as his successor but could not save the club from relegation.

Gainsborough Trinity
On 13 February 2018, Sinnott was appointed as manager of Gainsborough Trinity, who were then just inside the National League North relegation zone. The "Holy Blues" ended the 2017–18 season in 20th position and were relegated into the Northern Premier League Premier Division. He remained at The Northolme for the start of the 2018–19 campaign, but was sacked exactly one year into his appointment, following a 5–0 defeat by league leaders Farsley Celtic which left Trinity four points outside the play-offs.

Personal life
His son, Jordan, was also a professional footballer. Sinnott signed his son for Altrincham in February 2015, following a previous loan spell. Jordan died at the age of 25 after being attacked during a night out on 25 January 2020.

Career statistics

Playing statistics
Source:

A.  The "Other" column constitutes appearances and goals in the League Cup, League Trophy, Football League play-offs and Full Members Cup.

Managerial statistics

Honours

as a Player
Individual
PFA Third Division Team of the Year: 1990–91

Huddersfield Town
Football League Second Division play-offs: 1995

Watford
FA Cup runner up: 1984

as a Manager
Farsley Celtic
Northern Premier League First Division third-place promotion: 2003–04
Northern Premier League play–offs: 2005–06
West Riding County Cup: 2006
Conference North play–offs: 2007

Altrincham
Conference North play-offs: 2014

References

1965 births
Living people
People from Pelsall
English footballers
Association football defenders
England under-21 international footballers
Walsall F.C. players
Watford F.C. players
Bradford City A.F.C. players
Crystal Palace F.C. players
Huddersfield Town A.F.C. players
Oldham Athletic A.F.C. players
Scarborough F.C. players
Premier League players
English Football League players
English football managers
Farsley Celtic F.C. managers
Port Vale F.C. managers
Bradford (Park Avenue) A.F.C. managers
Altrincham F.C. managers
Gainsborough Trinity F.C. managers
Northern Premier League managers
English Football League managers
National League (English football) managers
FA Cup Final players